The Benezit Dictionary of Artists (in French, Bénézit: Dictionnaire des peintres, sculpteurs, dessinateurs et graveurs) is an extensive publication of bibliographical information on painters, sculptors, designers and engravers created primarily for art museums, auction houses, historians and dealers. It was published by Éditions Gründ in Paris but has been sold to Oxford University Press.

First published in the French language in three volumes between 1911 and 1923, the dictionary was put together by Emmanuel Bénézit (1854–1920) and a team of international specialists with assistance from his son the painter Emmanuel-Charles Bénézit (1887–1975), and daughter Marguerite Bénézit. After the elder Bénézit's death the editors were Edmond-Henri Zeiger-Viallet (1895–1994) and the painter Jacques Busse (1922–2004), the younger Bénézit having already left Paris and moved to Provence. The next edition was an eight-volume set published between 1948 and 1955, followed by a ten-volume set in 1976 and a 14-volume set in 1999. In 2006, an English-language edition was published for the first time. A 14-volume set, it has more than 20,000 pages, with over 170,000 entries.

Online biographies
Since 2011, for a fee, the content of the Benezit can be accessed online at Oxford Art Online. Free access is available for members of some UK public libraries.

Editions

French
  (14 volumes)
  (14 volumes)
  (10 volumes)

English
  (14 volumes)
  (14 volumes)
The Benezit Dictionary of British Graphic Artists and Illustrators (Oxford University Press, 2012, two volumes)

Notes and references

External links
 Official web site
 Table of contents

Art and architecture dictionaries
Art history books
Biographical dictionaries
Biographies about artists
Benezit
Oxford University Press reference books